Fautor is a genus of sea snails, marine gastropod mollusks, in the subfamily Calliostomatinae ( of the family Calliostomatidae.

Species
Species within the genus Fautor include:
 Fautor boucheti (B. A. Marshall, 1995)
 Fautor chesterfieldensis (B. A. Marshall, 1995)
 Fautor chinglini S.-I Huang & I-F. Fu, 2022
 Fautor comptus (A. Adams, 1855)
 Fautor consobrinus Powell, 1958
 Fautor excultus Iredale, 1931
 Fautor houbricki (B. A. Marshall, 1995)
 Fautor lepton (Vilvens, 2012)
 Fautor manesol (S.-I Huang & I-F. Fu, 2015)
 † Fautor marwicki (Finlay, 1923)
 Fautor metivieri (B. A. Marshall, 1995)
 Fautor necopinatus (B. A. Marshall, 1995)
 Fautor paradigmatus (B. A. Marshall, 1995)
 Fautor periglyptus (B. A. Marshall, 1995)
 Fautor richeri (B. A. Marshall, 1995)
 † Fautor temporemutatus (Finlay, 1924)
 Fautor vaubani (B. A. Marshall, 1995)

The following species were brought into synonymy:
 Fautor cheni Dong, 2002: synonym of Calliostoma cheni (Dong, 2002)
 Fautor kurodai Azuma, 1975: synonym of Calliostoma kurodai (Azuma, 1975)
 Fautor legrandi (Tenison Woods, 1876): synonym of Calliostoma legrandi (Tenison Woods, 1876)
 Fautor opalinus Kuroda & Habe, 1971: synonym of Calliostoma opalinum (Kuroda & Habe, 1971) (original combination)
 Fautor poupineli (Montrouzier, 1875): synonym of Dactylastele poupineli (Montrouzier, 1875)
 Fautor sagamiensis]' Ishida & Uchida, 1977: synonym of Calliostoma sagamiense'' (Ishida & Uchida, 1977)

References

 Marshall, B. A. (2016). New species of Venustatrochus Powell, 1951 from New Zealand, and new species of Falsimargarita Powell, 1951 and a new genus of the Calliostomatidae from the southwest Pacific, with comments on some other calliostomatid genera (Mollusca: Gastropoda). Molluscan Research. 36: 119–141.

External links
 Iredale, T. (1924). Results from Roy Bell's molluscan collections. Proceedings of the Linnean Society of New South Wales. 49: 179-278

Calliostomatidae